Yarvaliabad (also Romanized as Yārvalīābād; also known as Yārvalī and Dah Pahlavān) is a village in Itivand-e Shomali Rural District, Kakavand District, Delfan County, Lorestan Province, Iran. At the 2006 census, its population was 223, in 45 families.

References 

Towns and villages in Delfan County